Jan Paul Schutten (born 30 November 1970) is a Dutch writer of children's literature.

Career 

Schutten's debut book Ruik eens wat ik zeg, de taal van dieren en planten was awarded in 2004 with the Vlag en Wimpel award. The book was illustrated by Sieb Postuma.

In 2008, Schutten received the Gouden Griffel award for his book Kinderen van Amsterdam with illustrations by Paul Teng. In the following year, Schutten wrote the book De wraak van het spruitje, the Kinderboekenweekgeschenk on the occasion of the annual Boekenweek.

Schutten won the Nienke van Hichtum-prijs in 2013 for his book Het raadsel van alles wat leeft. He also won his second Gouden Griffel award for this book in 2014. The book was illustrated by Floor Rieder who won the Gouden Penseel award for her illustrations in 2014. The book also marked Rieder's debut as children's book illustrator.

Schutten won another Vlag en Wimpel award in 2012 for his book Groeten uit 2030!.

Personal life 

Schutten is married to Bibi Dumon Tak who is also an award-winning writer of Dutch children's literature.

Awards 

 2004: Vlag en Wimpel, Ruik eens wat ik zeg, de taal van dieren en planten
 2008: Gouden Griffel, Kinderen van Amsterdam
 2012: Vlag en Wimpel, Groeten uit 2030!
 2013: Nienke van Hichtum-prijs, Het raadsel van alles wat leeft
 2014: Gouden Griffel, Het raadsel van alles wat leeft
 2019: Zilveren Griffel, Het mysterie van niks en oneindig veel snot

References

External links 

 Jan Paul Schutten (in Dutch), Digital Library for Dutch Literature
 Jan Paul Schutten (in Dutch), jeugdliteratuur.org

1970 births
Dutch children's writers
20th-century Dutch male writers
21st-century Dutch male writers
Living people
Nienke van Hichtum Prize winners
Gouden Griffel winners